Hoshiiwato Yūji (born 25 July 1955 as Yūji Noguchi) is a former sumo wrestler from Kaimon, Kagoshima, Japan. He made his professional debut in May 1970 and reached the top division in July 1989, 115 tournaments later. This was the slowest ever rise to the top division. His highest rank was maegashira 14. Upon retirement from active competition after the January 1991 tournament, where he faced demotion to the makushita division, he became an elder in the Japan Sumo Association and took over as head coach at Michinoku stable. He oversaw the promotion to the jūryō division of two wrestlers from Argentina, Hoshitango and Hoshiandesu. He left the Sumo Association in December 1997 and was succeeded as head coach by former ōzeki Kirishima. He ran a restaurant in Kagoshima city after leaving sumo.

Throughout his long career, Hoshiiwato changed his shikona or fighting name eight times, making his debut under his family name of Noguchi and then being variously known as Kaimondake, Hoshikabuto, Satsumafuji, Hoshisatsuma, Oiwato, Hoshiiwato, Hoshikabuto (again) and finally Hoshiiwato again. This is believed to be a record.

Career record

See also
Glossary of sumo terms
List of past sumo wrestlers

References

1955 births
Japanese sumo wrestlers
Sumo people from Kagoshima Prefecture
Living people